The Central District of Qods County is in Tehran province, Iran. At the National Census in 2006, its population (as a part of the former Qods District of Shahriar County) was 237,077 in 62,355 households. The following census in 2011 counted 290,663 people in 85,169 households, by which time the district had been separated from the county and Qods County established. At the latest census in 2016, the district had 316,631 inhabitants in 96,680 households.

References 

Qods County

Districts of Tehran Province

Populated places in Tehran Province

Populated places in Qods County